Anjali Sud (born August 13, 1983) is an American businesswoman of Indian descent and the CEO of Vimeo, the online video platform. Sud was appointed to the position in July 2017, after previously serving as General Manager and head of marketing. Sud serves on the board of Dolby Laboratories, is a designated Young Global Leader of the World Economic Forum, and was listed as one of Fortune's 40 Under 40 rising business leaders in 2018.

Early life and education 
Sud was born in Detroit, Michigan, the daughter of Indian immigrants from Punjab. She grew up in Flint, Michigan. In 1997, at age 14, Sud left Flint to study at Phillips Andover Academy, a private school in Andover, Massachusetts.

Sud graduated from the Wharton School of the University of Pennsylvania in 2005, with a B.Sc. in Finance and Management. In 2011, she received her MBA from Harvard Business School.

Career 
Between 2005 and 2014, Sud held positions in finance, media and e-commerce at Sagent Advisors, Time Warner and Amazon.

In 2014, Sud joined Vimeo, an IAC subsidiary, as Head of Global Marketing. She later served as General Manager of Vimeo's core creator business, where she built out the company's offering for hosting, distributing and monetizing videos. In that role, Sud led a number of launches on the platform, including Vimeo Business (a membership plan for marketers and brands), 360 video support, and video collaboration and review tools.

Sud was appointed to CEO of Vimeo in July 2017, as the company announced its plans to refocus its strategy from investing in original content to offering software and tools for video creators. In September 2017, Sud oversaw the acquisition of Livestream. In April 2019, Sud oversaw the acquisition of video editing app Magisto.

In November 2020, Vimeo raised $150 million in equity from Thrive Capital and GIC at a valuation of $2.75 billion. In January 2021, Vimeo raised $300 million in equity from T. Rowe Price and Oberndorf Enterprises at a valuation of over $5 billion. In May 2021, IAC completed a spinoff of Vimeo into an independent publicly-traded company on Nasdaq (ticker: VMEO).

Sud serves on the board of Dolby Laboratories. She is a designated Young Global Leader of the World Economic Forum.

Awards and honors 
In November 2017, Sud was listed as one of The Hollywood Reporter's Next Gen: 35 Under 35 honorees.

In March 2018, Crain's New York selected Sud as one of its annual 40 Under 40 honorees.

In July 2018, Sud was named #14 on Fortune's "2018 40 Under 40" list. She was included on Adweek's Power List later that month.

In December 2019, Sud was honored with a Muse Award by the New York Women in Film & Television, along with Gloria Estefan and Ann Dowd.

In December 2021, Sud was named by Business Today as one of the most powerful women in business.

References

External links 
 

1983 births
Living people
American women chief executives
American chief executives in the media industry
American technology chief executives
American people of Indian descent
Phillips Academy alumni
Wharton School of the University of Pennsylvania alumni
Harvard Business School alumni
People from Flint, Michigan
Businesspeople from Detroit
21st-century American businesspeople
21st-century American businesswomen
Vimeo